P. Hans B. Runemark (7 January 1927 – 11 December 2014) was a Swedish botanist and lichenologist, emeritus professor at Lund University.

Biography 
Born in Chicago, (U.S.A.), he graduated in 1956 at Lund University, having started his studies there on the yellow species of the lichen, Rhizocarpon, in the late 1940s. The work undertaken for his PhD was subsequently published as a monograph in the journal Botaniska Notiser. Runemark used the newly discovered technique of paper chromatography as a tool in lichen taxonomy, and his monograph included  species descriptions with detailed distribution maps for the Nordic and European regions. His work is still regarded as a useful contribution to the understanding of the genus, and can be considered to be one of the first modern monographs.

Having gained his PhD, Runemark left lichenology and studied the vascular flora of the Aegean Islands in Greece, becoming interested in island endemics. He used the plants in the archipelago as a laboratory to study evolutionary processes in small plant populations.

Runemark was appointed professor of systematic botany at Lund University from 1970 to 1992. In July 1993 he was awarded the OPTIMA Gold Medal in Borovetz, Bulgaria, in recognition of his botanical work.

Eponymy 
The plant taxa Omphalodes runemarkii Strid & Kit Tan, Iberis runemarkii  Greuter & Burdet, Arenaria runemarkii  Phitos, Cerastium runemarkii  Möschl & Rech. f., Silene sedoides subsp. runemarkii Oxelman, Asperula lilaciflora subsp. runemarkii Ehrend. & Schönb.-Tem., Allium runemarkii  Trigas & Tzanoud., Prunus runemarkii Eisenman, Thinopyrum runemarkii Á.Löve, Astragalus runemarkii Maassoumi & Podlech and Euphorbia sultan-hassei Strid, B.Bentzer, Bothmer, Engstrand & M.A.Gust., are named after him.

References

Swedish lichenologists
Swedish botanists
1927 births
2014 deaths
Lund University alumni
Academic staff of Lund University